Anna Kraus may refer to:

Anna Kraus (opera)
Anna Kraus (soccer)

See also
 Anna Krauss
 Anja Krause